is a song by Japanese pop rock duo Garnidelia. It was released as the unit's fifth single digitally on August 7, 2016, and received physical release on August 17, 2016. The song is released along with the B-Side Gokuraku Jodo. It reached number 20 on Oricon and number 40 on Japan Hot 100. It was used as the second ending theme song for the anime series Qualidea Code.

Release
On 26 March 2016, Marvelous revealed in event at the AnimeJapan 2016 event about more details of the anime series Qualidea Code, including the ending song "Yakusoku -Promise Code-" that would be sung by Garnidelia. The song was released as a single on 23 August 2020 on three edition; Regular edition, Limited edition and Limited anime edition. The single reached number 20 on Oricon, 40 on Japan Hot 100, and 8 on Japan Hot Animation with spent 7, 1 and 1 weeks respectively. The song was featured in their second album "Violet Cry".

Music video
The music video for "Yakusoku -Promise Code-" was directed by Shin Okawa. The video tell a story about a girl with her friend playing in some warehouse. When they were walking after they finished playing, they saw a black virus popping up in front of them. After that, her friend got consumed by the virus even though she tries to help her, and she was crying because of her failure. When she was walking into a land with many swords stuck in the land, she take one of the sword, and she learn how to use that sword. Several years past, and the girl, now already an adult, had mastered to use the sword. She walked to the path when she and her friends encounter the virus, trying to kill the virus and save her friend. the virus summon the army to stop her but it's failed, and she finally kill the virus. Some scenes sometimes show toku playing piano and MARiA singing in the warehouse, with both of them wearing Yukata. And some scene show the land of the sword, too. The video end when the girl takes her friend's hand from the virus, saving her life.

Track listing
All tracks written by MARiA.

Regular edition

Limited edition

Limited anime edition

Personnel
Garnidelia
MARiA – vocals
toku  – music, record

Bands
Hiroshi Sekita   - Bass
Takeo Kajiwara - Guitar
Seiichiro Hayakawa  - Drums
Ayako Himata - Violin & Viola

Production
Shigeki Kashii, toku – record, mixer
Hidekazu Sakai – mastering

Charts

Release history

Notes

References

Garnidelia songs
2016 singles
MARiA
Anime songs
2016 songs